Acyl-homoserine lactone acylase may refer to:
 Quorum-quenching N-acyl-homoserine lactonase, an enzyme
 Acyl-homoserine-lactone acylase, an enzyme